In Depth is a program that airs monthly on C-SPAN 2 as part of their Book TV programming, and features a different writer each month. Each interview covers the breadth of that author's writing career, and incorporates viewer calls and e-mails. The show is typically broadcast Live television live the first Sunday of each month. The first program was on February 6, 2000, and was a discussion with historian John Lukacs. For the first several years of the show, episodes were not produced during the summer months. From the first episode through March 2019, the standard interview length was three hours. Beginning in April 2019, with Nomi Prins, the standard interview was reduced to two hours.

There have been a few exceptions to the practice of featuring one single author, as with the programs featuring the Strand Bookstore, Frank J. Williams Frank Williams and Edna Greene Medford's discussion of Bibliography of Abraham Lincoln (writings on Lincoln), and John K. Wilson and Jonathan Karp's discussions of the writings of Barack Obama and John McCain.

Sometimes, the profile will include taped footage of the author's own home or office, so as to give further perspective on how they approach the task of writing. On occasion (as with the programs with Shelby Foote and Harold Bloom ) entire three-hour interviews have been conducted live at the home or office of the featured author.

In 2018, the series featured 12 authors best known for their works of fiction, as opposed to their standard practice of interviewing authors best known for nonfiction works.

List of episodes
Note: The dates of original broadcast of each episode are listed below, along with the name of the featured guest. The name of the host is indicated in parenthesis. Each date links to a video of the full interview.

2000

February 6 – John Lukacs (Connie Doebele)
March 5 – Richard Rhodes (Connie Doebele)
April 2 – William F. Buckley Jr. (Brian Lamb)
May 7 – Joan Didion (Connie Doebele)
September 3 – Milton Friedman (Brian Lamb)
October 1 – Gore Vidal (Susan Swain)
November 5 – Stephen Ambrose (Connie Doebele)
December 3 – Arthur Schlesinger Jr. (Brian Lamb)

2001

January 7 – Norman Podhoretz (Connie Doebele)
February 4 – Toni Morrison (Susan Swain)
March 4 – James McPherson (Connie Doebele)
April 1 – Studs Terkel (Steve Scully)
May 6 – Jacques Barzun (Connie Doebele)
September 2 – Shelby Foote (Brian Lamb)
October 7 – Richard Brookhiser (Connie Doebele)*
November 4 – David Halberstam (Susan Swain)
December 2 – David McCullough (Brian Lamb)

*Note: Richard Brookhiser's October 7 interview was cut short unexpectedly due to the beginning of Operation Enduring Freedom in Afghanistan, which started during his interview. Brookhiser later appeared on In Depth for a full three hours on April 1, 2012, thus becoming one of the only guests to make two appearances.

2002

January 6 – Cornel West (Connie Doebele)
February 3 – Tom Clancy (Steve Scully)
March 3 – Peggy Noonan (Susan Swain)
April 7 – Robert Caro (Brian Lamb)
May 5 – bell hooks (Connie Doebele)
June 2 – David Herbert Donald (Steve Scully)
September 1 – Howard Zinn (Steve Scully)
October 6 – Edmund Morris (Susan Swain)
November 3 – George Will (Brian Lamb)
December 1 – Bob Woodward (Susan Swain)

2003

January 5 – Phyllis Schlafly (Connie Doebele)
February 2 – Martin Gilbert (Connie Doebele)
March 2 – Susan Sontag (Susan Swain)
April 6 – Bernard Lewis (Steve Scully)
May 4 – Harold Bloom (Susan Swain)
June 1 – Noam Chomsky (Brian Lamb)
July 6 – Carlo D'Este (Connie Doebele)
August 3 – Camille Paglia (Connie Doebele)
September 7 – Jeff Shaara (Steve Scully)
October 5 – Stanley Crouch (Susan Swain)
November 2 – John Keegan (Brian Lamb)
December 3 – Douglas Brinkley (Steve Scully)

2004

January 4 – Thomas Fleming (Connie Doebele)
February 1 – Ken Auletta (Brian Lamb)
March 7 – Victor Davis Hanson (Connie Doebele)
April 4 – Margaret Macmillan (Connie Doebele)
May 2 – Niall Ferguson (Connie Doebele)
June 6 – Harold Holzer (Steve Scully)
July 4 – Forrest McDonald (Connie Doebele)
August 1 – Simon Winchester (Connie Doebele)
September 5 – Strand Bookstore (Brian Lamb)
October 3 – Angela Davis (Connie Doebele)
November 7 – David Hackett Fischer (Connie Doebele)
December 5 – Tom Wolfe (Brian Lamb)

2005

January 2 – Garry Wills (Connie Doebele)
February 6 – Charles Murray (Steve Scully)
March 6 – Helen Caldicott (Connie Doebele)
April 3 – Robert Kaplan (Peter Slen)
May 1 – Thomas Friedman (Susan Swain)
June 5 – Richard John Neuhaus (Peter Slen)
July 3 – H.W. Brands (Connie Doebele)
August 7 – William Least Heat-Moon (Connie Doebele)
September 4 – Harvey Mansfield (Connie Doebele)
October 2 – Sherwin Nuland (Peter Slen)
November 6 – Doris Kearns Goodwin (Steve Scully)
December 4 – John Updike (Susan Swain)

2006

January 1 – Ron Powers (Connie Doebele)
February 5 – Taylor Branch (Susan Swain)
March 5 – Francis Fukuyama (Connie Doebele)
April 2 – Shelby Steele (Peter Slen)
May 7 – Robert Remini (Steve Scully)
June 4 – Mark Bowden (Susan Swain)
July 2 – Joyce Appleby (Connie Doebele)
August 6 – Gary Gallagher (Steve Scully)
September 3 – Tammy Bruce (Peter Slen)
October 1 – John Hope Franklin (Peter Slen)
November 6 – Ray Kurzweil (Pedro Echevarria)
December 3 – Jimmy Carter (Connie Doebele)

2007

January 7 – P.J. O'Rourke (Peter Slen)
February 4 – Dinesh D'Souza (Connie Doebele)
March 4 – Barbara Ehrenreich (Connie Doebele)
April 1 – Alexander Cockburn (Connie Doebele)
May 6 – Marvin Olasky (Connie Doebele)
June 3 – Lewis Lapham (Connie Doebele)
July 1 – Michael Barone (Connie Doebele)
August 5 – Edward O. Wilson (Pedro Echevarria)
September 2 – Christopher Hitchens (Peter Slen)
October 7 – David Horowitz (Connie Doebele)
November 4 – Vincent Bugliosi (Peter Slen)
December 2 – Newt Gingrich (Susan Swain)

2008

January 6 – Nell Irvin Painter (Connie Doebele)
February 3 – David Levering Lewis (Peter Slen)
March 2 – John McWhorter (Peter Slen)
April 6 – Michael Eric Dyson (Pedro Echevarria)
May 4 – Alice Walker (Peter Slen)
June 1 – George Weigel (Connie Doebele)
July 6 – Katha Pollitt (Pedro Echevarria)
August 3 – Ralph Peters (Steve Scully)
September 7 – John K. Wilson and Jonathan Karp (Peter Slen)
November 2 – Steven Pinker (Connie Doebele)
December 7 – Kevin Phillips (Peter Slen)

2009
From this point forward, all interviews were hosted by Peter Slen, unless otherwise indicated.

January 4 – Bill Gertz
February 1 – Frank Williams and Edna Greene Medford
February 28 – Ronald Takaki (Pedro Echevarria)
April 5 – Robert Higgs
May 3 – Christopher Buckley
June 7 – Bill Ayers
July 5 – John Ferling (Susan Swain)
August 2 – Juan Williams (Steve Scully)
September 6 – Jonathan Kozol (Connie Doebele)
October 4 – Hugh Hewitt 
November 1 – Temple Grandin 
December 6 – Joy Hakim

2010

January 3 – Michelle Malkin 
February 7 – Paul Johnson 
March 7 – T.R. Reid 
April 4 – John Dean (Steve Scully)
May 2 – Pat Buchanan 
June 6 – Martha Nussbaum
July 4 – Bill Bennett (Pedro Echevarria)
August 1 – Ralph Nader
September 5 – Gordon Wood
October 3 – Michio Kaku
November 7 – Jonah Goldberg
December 5 – Salman Rushdie

2011

January 2 – Phyllis Bennis
February 6 – R. Emmett Tyrell
March 6 – Pauline Maier
April 3 – Ishmael Reed
May 1 – Tibor Machan (Susan Swain)
June 5 – Eric Posner
July 3 – Linda Hogan
August 7 – Ann Coulter
August 10 – Ellis Cose
October 2 – Michael Moore
November 6 – Ben Mezrich
December 4 – David Brooks (Steve Scully)

2012

January 1 – Chris Hedges
February 5 – Mark Steyn
March 4 – Randall Kennedy
April 1 – Richard Brookhiser
May 6 – Tom Brokaw
June 3 – Anna Quindlen
July 1 – David Pietrusza
August 1 – Julianne Malveaux
September 2 – Michael Beschloss
October 7 – Steven Johnson
November 4 – Kenneth Davis
December 2 – Tom Coburn

2013

January 6 – Donald Barlett and James Steele
February 3 – Randall Robinson
March 3 – Larry Schweikart
April 7 – Amy Goodman
May 5 – Melanie Phillips
June 2 – Rick Atkinson
July 7 – Mary Roach
August 4 – Ben Carson
September 1 – Ben Shapiro
October 6 – John Lewis
November 3 – Kitty Kelley
December 1 – Christina Hoff Sommers

2014

January 5 – Mark Levin
February 2 – Bonnie Morris
March 2 – Peniel Joseph
April 6 – Bing West
May 4 – Luis J. Rodriguez
June 1 – Amity Shlaes
July 6 – Reza Aslan
August 3 – Ron Paul
September 7 – Mary Frances Berry
October 5 – Joan Biskupic
November 2 – Michael Korda
December 7 – Arthur Brooks

2015

January 4 – Tavis Smiley
February 1 – Walter Isaacson
March 1 – Lani Guinier
April 5 – Ronald Kessler
May 3 – Jon Ronson
June 7 – Lawrence Wright
July 5 – Peter Schweizer (Steve Scully)
August 2 – Medea Benjamin
September 6 – Lynne Cheney
October 4 – Thom Hartmann
November 1 – Walter Williams
December 6 – Cokie Roberts

2016

January 3 – David Maraniss
February 7 – Eric Burns
March 6 – Jane Mayer
April 3 – Steve Forbes*
May 1 – Wil Haygood
June 5 – Steve Forbes*
July 3 – Sebastian Junger
August 7 – Jeffrey Toobin (Steve Scully)
September 4 – Dennis Prager
October 2 – Gerald Horne
November 6 – Kate Andersen Brower, William Seale, and Alvin Felzenberg, discussing U.S. presidents
December 4 – Steve Twomey, Eri Hotta, and Craig Nelson, discussing the Attack on Pearl Harbor

*Note: Steve Forbes was scheduled to be the guest for three hours on April 3, but on the way to Washington, D.C. that morning he was a passenger on Amtrak train #89, which derailed near Chester, Pennsylvania. Forbes was unhurt and returned to New York. Just after noon Eastern Time, he spoke via telephone with C-SPAN host Steve Scully for approximately 14 minutes about that experience. After the interview, C-SPAN 2 aired a program recorded June 18, 2014, in which Forbes discusses his book Money at a Washington, D.C. bookstore. Forbes eventually was an In Depth guest for a full three hours on June 5, 2016.

2017

January 1, 2017 – April Ryan, Eddie Glaude, and David Maraniss on the Presidency of Barack Obama (Steve Scully)
February 5, 2017 – Nick Adams
 March 5, 2017 – Dave Barry
April 2, 2017 – Annie Jacobsen
May 7, 2017 – Neil deGrasse Tyson
June 4, 2017 – Matt Taibbi
July 2, 2017 – Herb Boyd
August 6, 2017 – KrisAnne Hall
September 3, 2017 – Eric Metaxas
October 1, 2017 – Lynne Olson
November 5, 2017 – Michael Lewis (Steve Scully)
December 3, 2017 – Cornel West and Robert George

2018
For 2018, the program broke its tradition of interviewing nonfiction authors to interview best-selling fiction writers, focusing on authors of historical fiction, science and national security thrillers, and social commentary. The phrase “2018 Fiction Edition” was added to the show’s logo.

January 7, 2018 – David Ignatius
February 4, 2018 – Colson Whitehead
March 4, 2018 – Jeff Shaara
April 1, 2018 – Walter Mosley (Greta Brawner)
May 6, 2018 – David Baldacci (Susan Swain)
June 3, 2018 – Gish Jen
July 1, 2018 – Brad Thor
August 5, 2018 – Cory Doctorow (Pedro Echevarria)
September 2, 2018 – Jacqueline Woodson
October 7, 2018 – Geraldine Brooks
November 4, 2018 – Jodi Picoult
December 2, 2018 – Brad Meltzer (Steve Scully)

2019

January 6, 2019 – David Corn
February 3, 2019 – Dave Zirin
March 3, 2019 – Heather Mac Donald
April 7, 2019 – Nomi Prins
May 5, 2019 – Kathleen Hall Jamieson
June 2, 2019 – Evan Thomas
July 7, 2019 – Paul Kengor
August 4, 2019 – Lee Edwards
September 1, 2019 – Joanne Freeman
October 6, 2019 – Naomi Klein (Steve Scully)
November 3, 2019 – Imani Perry
December 1, 2019 – Jason Riley (Steve Scully)

2020

January 5, 2020 – Sebastian Gorka
February 2, 2020 – Deirdre McCloskey
March 1, 2020 – April Ryan
April 1, 2020 – Highlights show
May 3, 2020 – Highlights show
June 7, 2020 – Yuval Levin
July 5, 2020 – James Stavridis
August 2, 2020 – Wes Moore
September 6, 2020 – Ralph Reed
October 4, 2020 – Jill Lepore
November 1, 2020 – 20th Anniversary Commemoration
December 6, 2020 – Eddie Glaude

2021

January 2, 2021 – N/A
February 7, 2021 – Robert W. Merry
March 7, 2021 – Elizabeth Kolbert
April 4, 2021 – Harriet Washington
May 2, 2021 – Craig Shirley*
June 6, 2021 – Max Hastings
July 4, 2021 – Annette Gordon-Reed
August 2021 - None#
September 5, 2021 – Carol Swain
October 3, 2021 – Roxanne Dunbar-Ortiz
November 7, 2021 - Ross Douthat
December 5, 2021 - Victor Davis Hanson

*Author Ross Douthat was announced as the scheduled guest for this date several times during the previous week. Ronald Reagan biographer Craig Shirley appeared instead. No explanation was given for the change. The C-SPAN web page announcing Douthat's appearance (May 2, 2021) was still retrievable on May 3, 2021, the day following the broadcast with Shirley. Mr. Douthat appeared in a later episode on November 7, 2021. 

#Former independent counsel, U.S. solicitor general, and federal judge Ken Starr was supposed to appear on the program on August 1, 2021, but the episode was preempted when the U.S. Senate held a rare Sunday session to debate a spending bill. He was never rescheduled to appear.

2022

January 2, 2022 –- Allen Guelzo
February 6, 2022 -- Sheryll Cashin
March 2022—None*
April 5, 2022 -- Noam Chomsky
May 1, 2022 -- Lawrence Kudlow
June 5, 2022 -- Sam Quinones
July 3, 2022 -- Carol Anderson
August 7, 2022 -- Larry Elder
September 4, 2022 -- Steven Hayward (John McArdle)
October 2, 2022 -- Dan Abrams
November 6, 2022 -- Mark Updegrove
December 4, 2022 -- Peter Baker and Susan Glasser

*Author Sam Quinones was scheduled to appear on March 5, 2022, but communication between C-SPAN'S Washington, DC studio and Mr. Quinones's studio in Nashville, Tennessee could not be established. He appeared on a later episode aired June 5, 2022.

2023

January 1, 2023 –- Chris Hedges
February 5, 2023 -- Lance Morrow
March 5, 2023 -- Jeff Guinn

References

External links

C-SPAN original programming
2000 American television series debuts
2000s American television talk shows
2010s American television talk shows
2020s American television talk shows
Lists of writers
Interviews